Bekzadeh (also Romanized as Bekzādeh; also known as Bagzādeh, Begzādeh, Sīā Sīā Beg Zādeh, and Sīāsīā-ye Bag Zādeh) is a village in Howmeh-ye Jonubi Rural District, in the Central District of Eslamabad-e Gharb County, Kermanshah Province, Iran. At the 2006 census, its population was 202, in 46 families.

References 

Populated places in Eslamabad-e Gharb County